The 2014 North Texas Mean Green football team represented the University of North Texas during the 2014 NCAA Division I FBS football season. The team was led by fourth-year head coach Dan McCarney and played its home games at Apogee Stadium. It was the Mean Green's second season as members of Conference USA, competing in the West Division. They finished the season 4–8, 2–6 in C-USA play to finish in fifth place in the West Division.

Schedule

Schedule Source:

Game summaries

Texas
Sources:

SMU

Louisiana Tech

Nicholls State

Indiana

UAB

Southern Miss

Rice

Florida Atlantic

UTEP

FIU

UTSA

References

North Texas
North Texas Mean Green football seasons
North Texas Mean Green football